The Imperial Hotel in Atlanta is one of the few remaining tall buildings from the city's construction boom in the early 20th century. The former hotel was opened in 1910, has 8 stories, and is representative of the Chicago school due to the flat roof and brick facade with grids of bay windows. It contains two historic Otis elevators. It was abandoned in 1980, added to the National Register of Historic Places a few years later, eventually converted to low-income housing, and is undergoing another round of renovations as of 2012.

History
The hotel was completed in 1910 as part of a construction boom in Atlanta and helped expand the city northward along Peachtree Street. In 1913 the hotel was said to have cost $300,000, have 119 rooms and 59 individual baths, offering both the American and European plans. The first floor was remodeled in 1953 from Tudor arches to a projected floor entrance. The first floor was remodeled again following a fire in 1968. The building was purchased by John Portman in 1980 and abandoned. In 1990, homeless people began occupying it, and it was converted to low-income housing in 1996 when Atlanta was cleaning up to host the Olympics.

In 2014, following a comprehensive recapitalization and renovation, the Imperial Hotel - now renamed The Commons at Imperial Hotel - reopened as 90-unit permanent supportive housing facility for former homeless and special needs residents through CaringWorks, INC. Atlanta-based Columbia Residential, a nationally recognized developer of multifamily affordable housing communities and National Church Residences, the nation's largest provider of affordable senior housing, are the developers and owners of the building.

Gallery

See also 

National Register of Historic Places listings in Fulton County, Georgia
Hotels in Atlanta

References

External links

 "Atlanta: a National Register of Historic Places Travel Itinerary: Imperial Hotel"

History of Atlanta
Hotels in Atlanta
National Register of Historic Places in Atlanta
Chicago school architecture in Georgia (U.S. state)
Hotel buildings completed in 1910
Hotels established in 1910
1910 establishments in Georgia (U.S. state)